The Promote Mandarin Council is a Singaporean organisation established in 1979 as part of then-PM Lee Kuan Yew's programme to promote Mandarin as the preferred language amongst Chinese Singaporeans.

Background

In 1966 the Singapore Government institutionalised a bilingual education policy, under which Singaporean students were required to learn both English and their "designated mother-tongue". For ethnic-Chinese Singaporeans, the designated language was Mandarin, in line with the national language policy pursued in both Nationalist and Communist China. The Goh Report, an evaluation of Singapore's education system by Dr. Goh Keng Swee, claimed that less than 40% of the student population managed to attain the minimum level of competency in two languages. The Government then alleged that learning of Mandarin amongst the Singapore Chinese was hindered by the home use of various varieties of Chinese. These varieties included Hokkien, Teochew, Cantonese and Hakka. Since then, the Singapore Government has pursued a hostile stance against these varieties, and has promoted the use of Mandarin as a universal mother-tongue amongst Singapore Chinese.

Establishment

In 1979, then-PM Lee Kuan Yew decided to establish the Promote Mandarin Commission as an organisation focused entirely on the promotion of the Mandarin language, with the initial goal of eliminating all other Chinese varieties in Singapore within the next decade. In 1998, the Commission was officially renamed as the Promote Mandarin Council.

References

External links
 Official site

Language policy in Singapore
Chinese languages in Singapore
Singapore government policies